Nannopodidae is a family of copepods belonging to the order Harpacticoida.

Genera:
 Acuticoxa Huys & Kihara, 2010
 Concilicoxa Kim & Lee, 2020
 Doolia Lee, 2020
 Huntemannia Poppe, 1884
 Ilyophilus
 Laophontisochra George, 2002
 Nannopus Brady, 1880
 Pontopolites Scott, 1894
 Rosacletodes Wells, 1985
 Talpacoxa Corgosinho, 2012

References

Copepods